

Hunferthus was a medieval Bishop of Elmham.

Hunferthus was consecrated and died between 816 and 824.

Notes

References

External links
 

Bishops of Elmham